The 2021 Vanderbilt Commodores baseball team represented Vanderbilt University during the 2021 NCAA Division I baseball season. Vanderbilt competed in the Eastern Division of the Southeastern Conference (SEC). The Commodores played their home games at Hawkins Field. Coach Tim Corbin led the Commodores in his 19th season with the program, reaching the 2021 College World Series finals, finishing as the national runner-up to No. 11 Mississippi State.

Previous season

The Commodores finished 13–5 overall, and 0–0 in the conference. The season was prematurely cut short due to the COVID-19 pandemic.

Roster

Coaching Staff

Schedule and results

Nashville Regional

Nashville Super Regional

College World Series

Rankings

Record vs. conference opponents

2021 MLB draft

†Rocker did not sign with the Mets, but did not return to Vanderbilt. Keegan did not sign with the Yankees and returned to Vanderbilt.

Notes

References

External links 
 Vanderbilt Baseball

Vanderbilt
Vanderbilt Commodores baseball seasons
Vanderbilt Commodores baseball
Vanderbilt
College World Series seasons